Leonardo Peixoto Príncipe (born 13 August 1996), known as Léo Príncipe, is a Brazilian professional footballer who plays as a right-back for Primorje.

Club career

Early career
Born in Rio de Janeiro, Príncipe started his career when he was 13 years old at CFZ, a club originally created by former Brazilian football legend Zico. He departed the club and spent two years at Vasco da Gama, then another year at Flamengo. After that, he joined Corinthians and won the 2014 U20 Campeonato Paulista, 2014 U20 Campeonato Brasileiro and the 2015 Copa São Paulo de Futebol Júnior, also being a runner up at the 2014 and 2016 editions.

Oeste (loan)
Príncipe was loaned to Oeste on 3 February for the remaining of the year as part of the squad for the 2016 Campeonato Paulista and 2016 Campeonato Brasileiro Série B.

He made his professional debut as part of the starting team against Corinthians on 21 February. He participated in seven games during the team's campaign at the Campeonato Paulista and also on the debut at the Série B. He was called back by Corinthians on 15 May.

After six months on loan with Le Havre in France, he signed in January 2019 with Guarani again on loan for one year.

Honours
Corinthians
Campeonato Brasileiro Série A: 2017
Campeonato Paulista: 2017

References

External links
 Profile at Soccerway

1996 births
Living people
Footballers from Rio de Janeiro (city)
Association football fullbacks
Brazilian footballers
Sport Club Corinthians Paulista players
Le Havre AC players
FC Krumovgrad players
Brazilian expatriate footballers
Brazilian expatriate sportspeople in France
Brazilian expatriate sportspeople in Bulgaria
Brazilian expatriate sportspeople in Slovenia
Expatriate footballers in France
Expatriate footballers in Bulgaria
Expatriate footballers in Slovenia
Campeonato Brasileiro Série B players
Campeonato Brasileiro Série A players
Championnat National 2 players
Slovenian Second League players